Five Forks is an unincorporated community in Fairfax County, Virginia, United States. Originally, Five Forks was a small town located at the "forks" of Old Keene Mill Road and Lee Chapel Road. Today, the Five Forks area is almost exclusively located within the unincorporated community of Burke. Burke Town Plaza lies on the northeastern corner of the forks.

References

Unincorporated communities in Fairfax County, Virginia
Unincorporated communities in Virginia
Washington metropolitan area